The 1985 Malaysia 800 Selangor was the tenth and final round of the 1985 World Endurance Championship.  It took place at the Shah Alam Circuit, Malaysia on December 1, 1985.

Official results
Class winners in bold.  Cars failing to complete 75% of the winner's distance marked as Not Classified (NC).

Statistics
 Pole Position - #1 Rothmans Porsche - 1:21.330
 Fastest Lap - #1 Rothmans Porsche - 1:24.52
 Average Speed - 144.804 km/h

References

 

Selangor
Selangor
Motorsport competitions in Malaysia